Nell Gwyn is a 1934 British historical drama film directed by Herbert Wilcox and starring Anna Neagle, Cedric Hardwicke, Jeanne de Casalis, Miles Malleson and Moore Marriott. The film portrays the historical romance between Charles II of England and the actress Nell Gwyn. In the opening credits, the dialogue is credited to "King Charles II, Samuel Pepys and Nell Gwyn" with additional dialogue by Miles Malleson. It was also released as Mistress Nell Gwyn.

Cast
Anna Neagle as Nell Gwyn
Cedric Hardwicke as Charles II
Jeanne De Casalis as Duchess of Portsmouth
Muriel George as Meg
Helena Pickard as Mrs. Pepys
Dorothy Robinson as Mrs. Knipp
Esmé Percy as Samuel Pepys
Miles Malleson as Chiffinch
Moore Marriott as Robin
Craighall Sherry as Ben
Lawrence Anderson as James, Duke of York

Production
Herbert Wilcox had enjoyed a big success with the Nell Gwynn story in 1926 with Dorothy Gish and decided to remake it with Anna Neagle (who would become his wife in 1943). Part of the finance was raised by United Artists. The film encountered censorship difficulties in the US, insisting on the deletion of some scenes and addition of others, including a marriage between James and Nell, and an ending where Nell winds up in the gutter.

Reception
The film flopped in the US but was a big success in the rest of the world. According to Film Weekly it was the third most popular film in Britain in 1935.

Critical reception
The New York Times wrote, "Sir Cedric Hardwicke's superb portrait of a monarch who combined dignity and a love of pleasure sets the tone for the entire film, its easy graciousness and its pungent humours. Anna Neagle gives us a gay and sprightly Nell, seasoning the part with wantonness and edging it with vulgarity. These two, with Herbert Wilcox's fetching production at their back, set a gallant age in motion on the screen... All of the English players wear their laces and plumes with that true nonchalance which is one of their special gifts to the cinema. This "Nell Gwyn" is a costumed comedy of grace and wit"; and Graham Greene wrote, "I have seen few things more attractive than Miss Neagle in breeches."

References

External links
 
Nell Gwyn at BFI Screenonline

1934 films
Films set in the 1660s
Films set in the 1670s
Films set in the 1680s
1930s English-language films
Films directed by Herbert Wilcox
Films set in London
British historical drama films
Nell Gwyn
1930s historical drama films
British black-and-white films
British and Dominions Studios films
Films shot at Imperial Studios, Elstree
1934 drama films
Cultural depictions of Charles II of England
1930s British films